Róger Flores Solano (born 26 May 1959 in San José) is a retired Costa Rican football player, a manager and father of three.

He was the captain of the Costa Rica national football team during the 1990 FIFA World Cup held in Italy. It was the country's first World Cup ever and the national squad accomplished the historic feat of qualifying for the second round against all odds, beating teams apparently much stronger such as Scotland and Sweden. He scored a goal against Sweden, even though he was a defender.

Club career
In Costa Rica, Il Capitano (The Captain in Italian) started his career at Sagrada Familia and played for the two most popular teams, Alajuelense and Saprissa. He started out in Alajuela in the mid 80's, and was part of the team that won the CONCACAF Champions Cup in 1986. He won two national titles with Alajuelense as well. After his transfer to Saprissa, he reached the pinnacle of his career, becoming a star and the captain of the team as well of the national squad. With Saprissa, he won three more local tournaments, and another two CONCACAF Champions Cup.

He retired in 1996. As a player, he is remembered for his leadership and security on the field, and his excellent coverages of the opposing teams' strikers.

International career
Flores made his debut for Costa Rica in a March 1983 friendly match against Mexico and collected a total of 49 caps, scoring two goals. He represented his country in 18 FIFA World Cup qualification matches and played at the 1991 UNCAF Nations Cup, winning that title, and the 1991 CONCACAF Gold Cup.

His final international was a July 1991 CONCACAF Gold Cup match against Mexico.

International goals
Scores and results list Costa Rica's goal tally first.

Managerial career
After retiring, he went on to coach several teams in Costa Rica's First Division, as well as a minor national team. His first job was as coach of Goicoechea in 1996, where he was replaced by Didier Castro in March 1998. He was in charge at Santa Bárbara for only 4 weeks in 2000 and also managed Herediano.

In August 2009 Flores was appointed assistant at Liberia Mía.

Personal life
His son Andrés is a professional footballer who, like his father, plays as a defender.

References

External links

1959 births
Living people
Footballers from San José, Costa Rica
Association football defenders
Costa Rican footballers
Costa Rica international footballers
1990 FIFA World Cup players
1991 CONCACAF Gold Cup players
Copa Centroamericana-winning players
A.D. San Carlos footballers
L.D. Alajuelense footballers
Deportivo Saprissa players
Liga FPD players
Costa Rican football managers
C.S. Herediano managers
Deportivo Saprissa non-playing staff
CONCACAF Championship-winning players